El amor y el espanto (Love and Dread) is a 2001 Argentine drama film directed by Juan Carlos Desanzo and written by José Pablo Feinmann. It stars Miguel Ángel Solá, Blanca Oteyza and Victor Laplace.

Cast
 Miguel Ángel Solá as Jorge Luis Borges
 Blanca Oteyza as Beatriz Viterbo 
 Víctor Laplace as Carlos Daneri 
 Norman Briski as Erik Lönnrot
 Roberto Carnaghi as Pierre Menard
 Alicia Berdaxágar as Borges' Mother
 Cristina Banegas as Owner of the boarding house
 Roly Serrano as Alejandro Villari 
 Jean Pierre Reguerraz as Otto Dietrich
 Víctor Bruno as Bartender
 José María López as Funes
 Jorge Ochoa as Librarian

Production and release
The film premiered in Argentina on 17 May 2001. It was produced with an estimated budget of $650,000.

External links
 

2001 films
2000s Spanish-language films
2001 drama films
Argentine drama films
2000s Argentine films